Londonderry is an unincorporated community in Londonderry Township, Guernsey County, Ohio, United States.

History
Londonderry was platted in 1815. The community takes its name from Londonderry, in Northern Ireland. A post office was established at Londonderry in 1819, and remained in operation until 1907.

References

Unincorporated communities in Guernsey County, Ohio
Unincorporated communities in Ohio